The Gabol is a  Baloch tribe having a distinct identity through the centuries, and not a branch of any other Baloch tribe. During the reign of Mir Jalal Khan, the Gabol joined the Rind Federation. Eventually, they joined Mir Chakar Khan Rind as an ally against the Lasharis. Despite their Near Eastern origin, at present, the tribe is largely settled in Karachi, and interior Sindh (Jamshoro, Dadu, Ghotki, Thatho, Sijawal, Nawab Shah, Naushehro Feroz, Tando Allahyar, Matiari, Khairpur Mirs, Sukkur, Larkana, Shikarpur, Jacobabad, Kandhkot @ Kashmore) with significant numbers in Balochistan  as well as South Punjab (Rahimyar Khan, Bahawalpur, Muzafargarah, Multan, Dera Ghazi Khan, Rajanpur) and KPK (Dera Ismail Khan).

Etymology
According to a narrative گبول بچھ دیزک, found among the Gabols of Kirthar (کير ٿر جبل), the word Gabol means "castellated". M.K. Pikolin translated it as "valiant" or "strong".

In this context, Edward Lipinski, an authority on Arameans, writes:

"There is no reason why 'Gambulu' (a powerful Aramean tribe at Iran-Iraq border), which shows either dissimilation bb>mb in 'Gabbol' or simply epenthetic(طُفیلی) 'm' appearing before 'b'."

Similarly, Dr. Mir Alam Khan Raqib states:

"The letter 'm' in word 'Gambol' seems redundant and hard. So, due to its hardness the letter 'm' obsoleted and the word transformed to Gabol, still a well-known Baloch tribe."

Ancient Chaldo-Aramean tribes

The Bible first mentioned Gabol during 1600 BC, being a great-grandchild of Abraham by his third wife Keturah, daughter of Yaqtan the Canaanite. Madyan was a son of Abraham by Keturah mentioned in the Quran and other historical sources. Madyan had five sons, Ephah (عیفا), Epher (عفر), Hanoch (حنوک), Abida (عبیداع ), and Eldaah (الدّعا). Gabol was one of the four sons of Eldaah. He and his people migrated to Babylonia.

The tablets of the Assyrian antiquities in the British Museum mention Gabol continuously, from 745 BC (Tiglath-Pileser III تگلیتھ پلیسرسوم) to 562 BC (Nebuchadnezzar II بخت نصر), as an anti-Assyrian rebellious tribe. Assyrian sources call them a powerful Aramean tribe. "Aram" has been an alternative name for Syria (especially the region between the Euphrates and Balikh rivers). This region is also known as Aram-Naharaim. The Gabol tribe migrated from this part of Syria to southern Mesopotamia, and for this particular reason, Assyrians affirm them as Arameans (people from Aram Naharaim). The second largest migration of Arameans into Mesopotamia is entitled as Chaldeans. The autonomous state of Gaboli was one of the six states of Chaldea. It was the headquarters of the Gabol tribe residing near the border of Elam and the Persian Gulf. The fortified city Shapi'bal was the capital of Gaboli. The forefront troops of Mardukh-Baladan were composed of Gabols. They fought the Assyrians from 745 BC to 626 BC, leading to the formation of the Medean Empire along with other allies.

Sennacherib (703-681 BC) accounts the Gabol tribe as:

"Pastoral Nomad tribes who dwell on the bank of Tigris, the Garmu, the Ubulu, the Damunu, the Gabol, the Khindaru, the Ruh'ua, the Bugati or Bugutu who dwell on the bank of Karkh, the Hamaran, the Hagaran, the Nabatu, the Li,tau. Arameans who were not submissive, who take no heed of death. Chaldean, Aramean, Mannai (Medians) who had not been submissive to my yoke, I tore away from their lands."

It has often been said in the history of the Baloch people that they belong to the lineage of Arameans who lived in Aleppo and Babylonia, and that the Kurds and Baloch are groups of one split nation. Firdousi in the Shahnameh and Ibn e Hauqal in Surat Al Ardh (Arabic: صورۃ الارض) maintain these claims. Wadi Al Baloos was the first homeland of the Baloch people as claimed by various Baloch researchers. The Gabol tribe has been living in this specific territorial region through centuries at Gabol Village (Persian: روستائی گبول) near Lake Al Gabol (Arabic: Sabkhat al-Jabbul). They are included in the Bedouin tribes of Syria. Those who migrated to Kurdistan (Iraqi and Turkish) are included as Kurds, while other who moved to Iran (Persia, Sistan) are found as Baloch people. In Assyrian archaeological accounts, almost 40 Kaldo-Aramaic tribes are mentioned, but there are four specific tribes recorded in each rebellious activity, namely: Gabol, Bugti, Kalmati and Marri. The most important and populous tribes were the Gabol and Bugti. The location of the Bugti tribe was bordering the North of the autonomous state of Gaboli. Both Gabol and Bugti have been recorded as inhabited tribes in the outskirts of Urfa at the bank of the Tigris, in Assyrian letters. Until today, one of the dwellings of these tribes is Urfa in Iraqi Kurdistan. The Kalmati have been residing in Raqqa.

Historians have described the Gabol tribe. Their observations are investigative while Western historians benefited from the archaeological excavation documents. Both groups agree that Gabol belongs to the Chaldo-Aramean association of Arab nomads. They are first mentioned in the twelfth century BC. The tablets of Assyrian archaeology describe their mettle and bravery. The ancient autonomous state of Gaboli and the Gabol region near Aleppo have been recorded by Qudama Bin Ja'far (قدامہ بن جعفر), Ibn E Rusta (ابنِ رُستہ), Soomer (سُومر), Yaqoubi (یعقوبی), Ibn E Haukal (ابن حوقل), Majeed Zada (مجید زادہ،), Ibn E Abdul Munim Hameri (ابن عبدالمنعم حمیری), Al Kindi (الکندی), Ibn E Wasil (ابنِ واصل), Muqaddasi (مقدسی), Al Balazri (البلازری) Gazi (غزی), Sadir (صادر), Yaqout (یاقوت) and others in their writings.

Civil wars
During the Talpur rule in Sindh, the Gabol tribe was delegated to secure the coastal area of Karachi, recalled as the "War with Pirates". Corsairs used to loot ships near Karachi Port; once they invaded the port itself. Gabols are also mentioned in the 10th century A.D. in the outskirts of Karachi as fighting Arghons and Mongols. Nabi Bux Khan Baloch described the following wars and tribal disputes of the Gabol tribe in his books.

 Gandba Mandani attacks Burfats
 War between Jakhars & Gabols
 War between Kalmati Gabols & Kalhoras
 War between Kalmati Gabols & Jokhyas
 War between Gabols & Gadro
 First war between Gabols & Burfats at Kirthar Mountains
 First war between Kalmati Gabols & Jokhyas at Makli
 Second war between Kalmati Gabols & Jokhyas at Makli
 War at Qadman
 War at Gha'ghi
 Tribal dispute between Gabols & Burras
 War between Magsi & Rind clans
 Second war between Gabols & Burfats at Kirthar Mountains
 War between Gabols & Jokhyas with Bludgeon at Sukhan
 War between Gabols & Corsair (Pirates) at Karachi Port
 War with Jamoots
 War between Gabol & Mahar
 Tribal dispute between Gabol & Banglani
 Tribal dispute between Gabol & Bozdar Tribe

Chieftainship
Since the late 19th century, the chief, or Sardar, of Gabol tribe has systematically been chosen among Sardar Khudadad Khan Gabol, followed by his son Allah Baksh Gabol (1895-1972), grandson Sardar Ahmed Khan Gabol (1921-1998) and great-grandson Sardar Nabil Gabol. The family initially made a name for itself as landowners - the Gabols were among the richest landlords of Karachi during the colonial period and in the 1930s the British had to impose a ban on further acquisitions of land by the family, because at that time almost 70% of Karachi land was bought by the Gabol family. Since the 1920s the Gabol family has been very influential in the politics of Karachi and consistently been part of various governments.

References

External links
 Gabol; A Kurdish Clan of Ottoman Empire on Google Books website
 Gabol; A Kurdish Clan of Kurdistan on Google Books website

Ethnic groups in Pakistan
Baloch tribes
Sindhi tribes
Saraiki tribes
Kurdish tribes